The Hearts and Balls Charitable Trust, sometimes stylized as Heart+Balls is a Scottish registered charity. 

The charity was founded in 1999 following a spinal injury suffered by Struan Kerr-Liddell of the Lismore Rugby Club, and exists to support rugby players and their families in the aftermath of serious injury on the field. 

As of 2022, Hearts+Balls had provided over £700,000 in aid.

References

External links
Official Website

Charities based in Scotland
Organizations established in 1999
1999 establishments in Scotland